Uğur Akdemir (born 22 September 1988) is a Turkish professional footballer who plays as a defender for TFF First League club Gençlerbirliği.

References

External links

1988 births
People from Eyüp
Footballers from Istanbul
Living people
Turkish footballers
Turkey youth international footballers
Association football defenders
Gaziantep F.K. footballers
Orduspor footballers
Çaykur Rizespor footballers
Konyaspor footballers
Diyarbakırspor footballers
Kartalspor footballers
Balıkesirspor footballers
Adana Demirspor footballers
Eskişehirspor footballers
Boluspor footballers
Giresunspor footballers
Eyüpspor footballers
İskenderun FK footballers
Gençlerbirliği S.K. footballers
Süper Lig players
TFF First League players
TFF Second League players